Rudolf, Crown Prince of Austria (Rudolf Franz Karl Josef; 21 August 1858 – 30 January 1889) was the only son and third child of Emperor Franz Joseph I of Austria and Duchess Elisabeth of Bavaria (Sissi). He was heir apparent to the imperial throne of the Austro-Hungarian Empire from birth. In 1889, he died in a suicide pact with his mistress Mary Vetsera at the Mayerling hunting lodge. The ensuing scandal made international headlines.

Background

Rudolf was born at Schloss Laxenburg, a castle near Vienna, as the son of Emperor Franz Joseph I and Empress Elisabeth. He was named after the first Habsburg King of Germany, Rudolf I, who reigned from 1273 to 1291. Rudolf was raised together with his older sister Gisela and the two were very close. At the age of six, Rudolf was separated from his sister as he began his education to become a future Emperor of Austria. This did not change their relationship and Gisela remained close to him until she left Vienna upon her marriage to Prince Leopold of Bavaria. Rudolf's initial education under Leopold Gondrecourt was physically and emotionally abusive, and likely a cause of his later suicide.

Influenced by his tutor Ferdinand von Hochstetter (who later became the first superintendent of the Imperial Natural History Museum), Rudolf became very interested in natural sciences, starting a mineral collection at an early age. After his death, large portions of his mineral collection came into the possession of the University of Agriculture in Vienna, which is now known as the University of Natural Resources and Life Sciences, Vienna

In 1877, the Count of Bombelles was master of the young prince. Bombelles had been the custodian of Rudolf's aunt Empress Charlotte of Mexico.

In contrast with his deeply conservative father, Rudolf held liberal views that were closer to those of his mother. Nevertheless, his relationship with her was at times strained.

Marriage
In Vienna, on 10 May 1881, Rudolf married Princess Stéphanie of Belgium, a daughter of King Leopold II of Belgium, at the Augustinian Church in Vienna. Although their marriage was initially a happy one, by the time their only child, the Archduchess Elisabeth, was born on 2 September 1883, the couple had drifted apart, and he found solace in drink and other female companionship. Rudolf started having many affairs, and wanted to write to Pope Leo XIII about the possibility of annulling his marriage to Stéphanie, but the Emperor forbade it. In 1886, the spouses were diagnosed with gonorrhea, which rendered Stéphanie sterile.

Affairs and suicide

In 1886, Rudolf bought Mayerling, a hunting lodge. In late 1888, the 30-year-old Crown Prince met the 17-year-old Freiin (Baroness) Marie von Vetsera, known by the more fashionable Anglophile name Mary, and began an affair with her. On 30 January 1889, he and the young Baroness were discovered dead in the lodge as a result of an apparent joint suicide. As suicide would prevent him from being given a church burial, Rudolf was officially declared to have been in a state of "mental unbalance", and he was buried in the Imperial Crypt (Kapuzinergruft) of the Capuchin Church in Vienna.  Vetsera's body was smuggled out of Mayerling in the middle of the night and secretly buried in the village cemetery at Heiligenkreuz. The Emperor had Mayerling converted into a penitential convent of Carmelite nuns and endowed a chantry so that daily prayers would eternally be said by the nuns for the repose of Rudolf's soul.

Vetsera's private letters were discovered in a safe deposit box in an Austrian bank in 2015, and they revealed that she was preparing to commit suicide alongside Rudolf, out of love.

Aftermath of death
Rudolf's death plunged his mother, Empress Elisabeth,  into despair. She wore black or pearl grey, the colours of mourning, for the rest of her life and spent more and more time away from the imperial court in Vienna. Her daughter Gisela was afraid that she might also commit suicide. In 1898, while Elisabeth was abroad in Geneva, Switzerland, she was murdered by an Italian anarchist, Luigi Lucheni.

Rudolf's death had left Franz Joseph without a direct male heir. Franz-Joseph's younger brother, Archduke Karl Ludwig, was next in line to the Austro-Hungarian throne, though it was falsely reported that he had renounced his succession rights. In any case, his death in 1896 from typhoid made his eldest son, Archduke Franz Ferdinand, the new heir presumptive. However, Archduke Franz Ferdinand was assassinated in 1914 (an event that precipitated World War I), so when Emperor Franz-Joseph died in November 1916, he was succeeded instead by his grandnephew, Charles I of Austria. The demands of the American President, Woodrow Wilson forced Emperor Charles I to renounce involvement in state affairs in Vienna in early November 1918. As a result, the Austro-Hungarian Empire ceased to exist and a republic came into being without revolution. Charles I and his family went into exile in Switzerland after spending a short time at Castle Eckartsau.

In popular culture
 Mayerling, a 1936 film directed by Anatole Litvak, with Charles Boyer and Danielle Darrieux, based on a novel by Claude Anet.
 Sarajevo (1940), a film directed Max Ophüls starts with Rudolf's death.
 The fictionalized musical Marinka (1945), with book by George Marion Jr., and Karl Farkas, lyrics by George Marion, Jr., music by Emmerich Kalman.
 Mayerling, a 1957 film, starring Mel Ferrer as Crown Prince Rudolf, Audrey Hepburn as Baroness Mary Vetsara with Lorne Greene as Kaiser Franz Josef.
 Mayerling, a 1968 film, starring Omar Sharif as Crown Prince Rudolf, Catherine Deneuve as Mary with James Mason as Kaiser Franz Josef and Ava Gardner as Empress Elisabeth.
 Japanese Takarazuka Revue's "Utakata no Koi"/"Ephemeral Love", based on the 1968 film.
 Requiem for a Crown Prince, one-hour episode of the British documentary/drama series Fall of Eagles (1974), directed by James Furman and written by David Turner, tracks in detail the events of 30 January 1889 and the following few days at Mayerling.
 Miklós Jancsó's 1975 film Vizi privati, pubbliche virtù (Private Vices, Public Virtues), a reinterpretation in which the lovers and their friends are murdered by imperial authorities for treason and immorality.
 Kenneth MacMillan's 1978 ballet, Mayerling.
 Japanese manga by Higuri You, "Tenshi no Hitsugi" (Angel's Coffin) (2000).
 The Crown Prince, a 2006 television film in two parts directed by Robert Dornhelm.
 Composer Frank Wildhorn's musical Rudolf – Affaire Mayerling (2006), produced in some territories as The Last Kiss or Rudolf – The Last Kiss.
 The play Rudolf (2011) by David Logan dramatises the last few weeks of the life of Crown Prince Rudolf.
 A highly fictionalized version of the incident at Mayerling is depicted in the 2006 film The Illusionist. Crown Prince Leopold (played by Rufus Sewell) is a fictional analog of Rudolf.

Titles, styles and honours

Titles and styles
 21 August 1858 – 30 January 1889: His Imperial and Royal Highness The Crown Prince of Austria, Hungary, Bohemia and Croatia

Honours
Domestic
 Knight of the Golden Fleece, 1858
 Grand Cross of the Royal Hungarian Order of St. Stephen, 1877

Foreign

Ancestors

Gallery

See also
Lake Rudolf
Alma V. Hayne
Rudolf Island
List of heirs to the Austrian throne

Notes

Further reading
 Barkeley, Richard. The Road to Mayerling: Life and Death of Crown Prince Rudolph of Austria. London: Macmillan, 1958.
 Franzel, Emil. Crown Prince Rudolph and the Mayerling Tragedy: Fact and Fiction.  Vienna : V. Herold, 1974.
 Hamann, Brigitte. Kronprinz Rudolf: Ein Leben. Wien: Amalthea, 2005, .
 Listowel, Judith Márffy-Mantuano Hare, Countess of. A Habsburg Tragedy: Crown Prince Rudolf. London: Ascent Books, 1978.
 Lonyay, Károly. Rudolph: The Tragedy of Mayerling. New York: Scribner, 1949.
 Morton, Frederic. A Nervous Splendor: Vienna 1888/1889. Penguin 1979
 Rudolf, Crown Prince of Austria. Majestät, ich warne Sie... Geheime und private Schriften. Edited by Brigitte Hamann. Wien: Amalthea, 1979,  (reprinted München: Piper, 1998).
 Salvendy, John T. Royal Rebel: A Psychological Portrait of Crown Prince Rudolf of Austria-Hungary.  Lanham, MD: University Press of America, 1988.

External links

A profile of Marie Vetsera
IMDB on various Mayerling Films
Crown Prince Rudolfs death
 

 
House of Habsburg-Lorraine
Heirs apparent who never acceded
Austrian Roman Catholics
Suicides by firearm in Austria
Joint suicides
1858 births
1889 deaths
1880s suicides
19th-century Austrian people
People from Laxenburg
Austrian princes
Franz Joseph I of Austria
Burials at the Imperial Crypt
Sons of emperors
Sons of kings

Knights of the Golden Fleece of Austria
Grand Crosses of the Order of Saint Stephen of Hungary
Recipients of the Order of the Netherlands Lion
Knights of Malta
2
2
Grand Crosses of the Order of the Star of Romania
Recipients of the Order of the Cross of Takovo
Extra Knights Companion of the Garter
Recipients of the Order of the White Eagle (Russia)
Recipients of the Order of St. Anna, 1st class
Recipients of the Order of Saint Stanislaus (Russian), 1st class
Grand Croix of the Légion d'honneur
Knights of the Order of Saint Joseph